Adam Martin may refer to:

Adam Martin (singer) on The Voice (Australia series 1)
Adam Martin (politician) in 10th New York State Legislature
Adam Martin (cyclist) in 2013 UCI Cyclo-cross World Championships – Men's under-23 race

See also